Wakes Cove Provincial Park is a provincial park in the northeast corner of Valdes Island, located in the Gulf Islands in British Columbia, Canada. The park is only accessible by boat, and can be found on Marine Chart #3475 for further navigation details.

History
The park was created in June 2002.  The park is named for British retired naval Captain Baldwin Wake who purchased land in the area in 1876. The land continued to be owned by his descendants until the 1920s. Captain Wake went missing while sailing his sloop. Remains of his boat and belongings washed up on Thetis Island, but his body was never recovered.

Leisure use
Currently the park has no facilities for overnight camping, and its intended use, as stated by BC parks, is picnicking and hiking, with a view towards the development of expanded facilities in the future. The BC government has created a purpose statement and zoning plan for the park.

References

Provincial parks of British Columbia
Provincial Parks of the Gulf Islands